Bethulia is a genus of snout moths. It was described by  Ragonot, in 1888, and contains the species B. championella. It is found in the south-western United States, Mexico, Central and northern South America.

References

Moths described in 1888
Phycitinae